Zone 18 is a zone of the municipality of Ad Dawhah in the state of Qatar. The main districts recorded in the 2015 population census were As Salatah and Al Mirqab.

Demographics

Land use
The Ministry of Municipality and Environment (MME) breaks down land use in the zone as follows.

References 

Zones of Qatar
Doha